The 1970–71 Kentucky Colonels season was the fourth season of the Colonels in the American Basketball Association. University of Kentucky star Dan Issel was signed by the Colonels. Issel was given a 10-year contract worth $1.4 million, while playing all but one game in the whole season, leading to him being named Rookie of the Year, alongside averaging 29.9 points and 13.2 rebounds per game during the season. Despite a 10–5 record, Rhodes was fired during the season. After having business manager Alex Groza coach the team for 2 games, Frank Ramsey was hired to coach the rest of the season. In the Semifinals, the Colonels beat The Floridians 4 games to 2. In the Eastern Division Finals, they beat the Virginia Squires 4 games to 2. In the ABA Finals, they lost to the Utah Stars in seven games.

Roster
 35 Darel Carrier – Shooting guard
 25 Bobby Croft – Center 
 10 Louie Dampier – Point guard
 32 Tom Hagan – Guard
 4 Dennis Hamilton – Power forward 
 8 Dan Hester – Center 
 4 Les Hunter – Power forward 
 44 Dan Issel – Center 
 22 Goose Ligon – Power forward
 9/24 Cincy Powell – Small forward 
 33/54 Mike Pratt – Shooting guard	 
 2 Walt Simon – Small forward 
 5/50 Sam Smith – Small forward (ended up with the Stars prior to the end of the season)
 42 Al Williams – Forward
 3/45 Howie Wright – Shooting guard

Final standings

Eastern Division

Playoffs
Eastern Division Semifinals

Colonels win series, 4–2

Eastern Division Finals

Colonels win series, 4–2

ABA Finals

Colonels lose series, 4–3

Awards and honors
1971 ABA All-Star Game selections (game played on January 23, 1971)
Dan Issel
Cincy Powell
ABA Rookie of the Year
Dan Issel (shared with Charlie Scott)
ABA All-Second Team
Dan Issel (tied with Zelmo Beaty for the Center position)

References

 Colonels on Basketball Reference

External links
 RememberTheABA.com 1970–71 regular season and playoff results
 RememberTheABA.com Kentucky Colonels page

Kentucky Colonels seasons
Kentucky
Kentucky Colonels, 1970–71
Kentucky Colonels, 1970–71